was a Japanese actress.  Born in Tokyo, she developed fame largely through many performances as a supporting actress.

Selected filmography

External links

1960 births
2008 deaths
Actresses from Tokyo
Japanese film actresses
Japanese stage actresses
Japanese television actresses
20th-century Japanese actresses
21st-century Japanese actresses